Danny Wintjens (born 30 September 1983, in Maastricht) is a Dutch former professional football goalkeeper. His played for MVV Maastricht, FC Twente, SC Heerenveen, Fortuna Sittard, PEC Zwolle, VVV-Venlo and PSV Eindhoven.

External links
 Voetbal International profile 
 

1983 births
Living people
Footballers from Maastricht
Association football goalkeepers
Dutch footballers
Eredivisie players
Eerste Divisie players
MVV Maastricht players
FC Twente players
SC Heerenveen players
VVV-Venlo players
PEC Zwolle players
PSV Eindhoven players